Aituaria pontica  is an araneomorph spider of the family Nesticidae. It occurs in the Krasnodar region of Russia and in Georgia.

Original publication

References 

Nesticidae
Spiders of Russia
Spiders of Georgia (country)
Spiders described in 1932